Stranger Me is the third studio album by American musician Amy LaVere. It was released in July 4, 2011 by Archer Records.

Production
Stranger Me was recorded and mixed at Music + Arts Studio in Memphis, Tennessee and at The Garden Studio in London, England, with producer Craig Silvey.

Critical reception
Stranger Me was met with "generally favorable" reviews from critics. At Metacritic, which assigns a weighted average rating out of 100 to reviews from mainstream publications, this release received an average score of 78 based on 9 reviews. At AnyDecentMusic?, the release was given a 7.2 out of 10 based on a critical consensus of 7 reviews.

In a review for AllMusic, critic reviewer Hal Horowitz wrote "Stranger Me is not only a logical title but a demanding and surprisingly successful experiment that challenges both LaVere and the listener, pushing her into edgy, clearly non-commercial areas." Steve Pick of Blurt wrote "LaVere's vocals are deceptively lightweight. Her voice is high and thin, but she phrases eloquently and conveys a wide range of emotional conviction throughout all her work." At Paste, Stephen Deusner said LaVere's release is a "well-rounded album."

Track listing

Personnel

Musicians
 Amy LaVere − vocals, bass
 Jonathan Kirkscey − cello
 David Cousar − guitar
 Clint Maedgen − flute
 Jim Spake − sax
 Rick Steff − accordion, piano, vibrachime
 Nahshon Benford − trumpet
 Beth Luscombe − viola
 Bobby Furgo − violin
 David Brookings − vocals
 Jimbo Mathus − vocals
 Patrick McKinney − vocals
 Steve Selvidge − vocals
 Captain Beefheart − vocals
 Bobby Charles − vocals

Production
 Craig Silvey − producer, engineer, mixing
 Ward Archer − producer
 George Marino − mastering

References

External links
 
 

2011 albums
Archer Records albums
Amy LaVere albums